The Guerra de Dinastías (literally "War of the Dynasties", or "War of the Families")  show is a major lucha libre supercard show produced and scripted by Mexican professional wrestling promotion International Wrestling Revolution Group (IWRG). The show was sanctioned by  Promotores Asociados de Lucha Libre ("Wrestling Promoters Association"; PALL) and took place on January 31, 2019, in Arena Naucalpan, Naucalpan, State of Mexico, Mexico. The top matches were shown live on the +LuchaTV YouTube channel.

In the main event the Guerrero brothers (Gran Guerrero and Último Guerrero) defeated the Luna brothers (Sharlie Rockstar and Mr. Electro), with the Guerreros being special guests from the Consejo Mundial de Lucha Libre (CMLL). Further down the card father/son team of El Solar and El Solar Jr. defeated Blue Panther and Black Panther. The show also featured several members of the Montañez, supposedly French Mixed Martial Arts fighters, including Francois Montañez  defeating Dr. Cerebro in a Luchas de Apuestas ("bet match"), Jean and Pierre winning the TWS Caribbean Tag Team Championship and Kevin and Portos Montañez winning the second match of the night.

Event
The Guerra de Dinastías event featured seven professional wrestling matches with different wrestlers involved in pre-existing scripted feuds, plots and storylines. Wrestlers were portrayed as either heels (referred to as rudos in Mexico, those that portray the "bad guys") or faces (técnicos in Mexico, the "good guy" characters) as they followed a series of tension-building events, which culminated in a wrestling match or series of matches.

Matches

References

External links 
 

2019 in professional wrestling
2019 in Mexico
International Wrestling Revolution Group shows
January 2019 events in Mexico